Binaca is an oral hygiene brand that is marketed in India and owned by Dabur.

History
It was launched in 1951–52 as a toothpaste brand Binaca Top. It sponsored an extremely popular music show on Radio Ceylon and later on All India Radio, Binaca Geetmala which was hosted by noted radio personality Ameen Sayani.

Post acquisition
Dabur initially launched a toothpowder under the Binaca brand but withdrew within a year as sales volumes were low. However, after it was unable to sell the brand at the price it expected, it announced that it would revive it by marketing a new herbal toothpaste under the Binaca brand. Currently, Dabur markets toothbrushes under the Binaca brand.

See also

List of toothpaste brands
Index of oral health and dental articles
Cibaca (brand)

References

Brands of toothpaste
Oral hygiene
Indian brands